Carrick is a village located within the civil parish of Glencolmcille in County Donegal, Ireland. As of the 2016 census, the population of the village was 265. Carrick is located between neighbouring towns Glencolmcille, Meenanary, Teelin and Kilcar. Nearby is Sliabh Liag, the highest sea cliff in Europe.

Amenities
The village has a post office as well as a number of pubs, shops and coffee shops. The Roman Catholic church in the village is dedicated to Saint Colm Cille, and was built in the 1850s. The local national school has an enrollment of approximately 80 pupils, and the secondary school had an enrollment of 214 students in 2019. Teams representing the secondary school, Coláiste na Carraige, have won a number of trophies in Gaelic football.

References

Towns and villages in County Donegal